Giovanni Bracco (6 June 1908 at Biella – 7 August 1968 at Biella) was an Italian racing car driver.

He lived in Biella, home town of other racing aces such as Mario Porrino and Lamberto Grolla. Before and after World War II he had been racing Lancia Aprilias. He had won the 1948 Italian Grand Prix (2-litre class) in a Maserati A6 GCS, before joining Ferrari for 1950–52, winning the 1952 Mille Miglia in a Ferrari 250 S. With his younger pupil, Umberto Maglioli, he came second in the 1951 Mille Miglia, driving a Lancia Aurelia B20. He raced a Maserati 200S in 1955. At the Modena Grand Prix on 28 September 1947 he lost control of his Delage 3000, accidentally killing five spectators standing too close to the road .

Formula One World Championship results
(key) (Races in bold indicate pole position; Races in italics indicate fastest lap)

References

Italian racing drivers
Ferrari Formula One drivers
1908 births
1968 deaths
24 Hours of Le Mans drivers
People from Biella
World Sportscar Championship drivers
Sportspeople from the Province of Biella

Carrera Panamericana drivers
12 Hours of Pescara drivers